Denis Shurshin (born ) is a Russian male  track cyclist. He competed in the sprint event at the 2013 UCI Track Cycling World Championships.

References

External links
 Profile at cyclingarchives.com

1989 births
Living people
Russian track cyclists
Russian male cyclists
Place of birth missing (living people)